The Central Visayan false gecko (Pseudogekko atiorum) is a species of gecko. It is endemic to the Philippines. 

The scientific name was chosen to honor the Ati people, a Negrito ethnic group thought to be the aboriginal inhabitants of the Philippines.

References 

Pseudogekko
Reptiles described in 2015
Reptiles of the Philippines